Papuliscala is a genus of  small sea snails, marine gastropods in the family Epitoniidae of the superfamily Epitonioidea, the wentletraps, the purple snails, and their allies.

Species
Species within the genus Papuliscala include:
 † Papuliscala ambulator Lozouet, 1999 
 Papuliscala atlantisa Hoffman, Gofas & Freiwald, 2020
 Papuliscala carolienae Hoffman, Gofas & Freiwald, 2020
 Papuliscala cerithielloides Bouchet & Warén, 1986
 Papuliscala daani Hoffman, Gofas & Freiwald, 2020
 Papuliscala dictyophora Hoffman, Gofas & Freiwald, 2020
 Papuliscala diminuta Castellanos, Rolán & Bartolotta, 1987
 Papuliscala elongata (Watson, 1881)
 Papuliscala japonica (Okutani, 1964)
 Papuliscala luuki Hoffman, Gofas & Freiwald, 2020
 Papuliscala lydiae Hoffman & Freiwald, 2017
 Papuliscala meteorica Hoffman, Gofas & Freiwald, 2020
 Papuliscala mikra Hoffman, Gofas & Freiwald, 2020
 Papuliscala platoensis Hoffman, Gofas & Freiwald, 2020
 Papuliscala praelonga (Jeffreys, 1877)
 Papuliscala seamountae Hoffman, Gofas & Freiwald, 2020
 Papuliscala superlata (Finlay, 1930)
 Papuliscala tavianii Bouchet & Warén, 1986
 Papuliscala vixcostata Hoffman, Gofas & Freiwald, 2020
Synonymized species 
 Papuliscala annectens (A. W. B. Powell, 1951): synonym of  Gregorioiscala annectens (A. W. B. Powell, 1951)
 Papuliscala nordestina S. Lima & Christoffersen, 2013: synonym of Papuliscala elongata (R. B. Watson, 1881)
 Papuliscala scalariformis (de Folin, 1877): synonym of  Papuliscala praelonga (Jeffreys, 1877)

References

 Gofas, S.; Le Renard, J.; Bouchet, P. (2001). Mollusca, in: Costello, M.J. et al. (Ed.) (2001). European register of marine species: a check-list of the marine species in Europe and a bibliography of guides to their identification. Collection Patrimoines Naturels, 50: pp. 180–213
 Spencer, H.; Marshall. B. (2009). All Mollusca except Opisthobranchia. In: Gordon, D. (Ed.) (2009). New Zealand Inventory of Biodiversity. Volume One: Kingdom Animalia. 584 pp
 Hoffman L., Gofas S. & Freiwald A. (2020). Ten new species in Papuliscala de Boury, 1911 (Gastropoda, Epitoniidae) from the South Azorean Seamount Chain. Iberus. 38(1): 29-53.

Epitoniidae